Tháp Chàm station is a railway station on the North–South railway (Reunification Express) line in Vietnam. It serves the city of Phan Rang–Tháp Chàm in Ninh Thuận Province. A branch line to Da Lat once started here.

References

Buildings and structures in Ninh Thuận province
Railway stations in Vietnam